Pseudoxenodon is a genus of snakes of the subfamily Pseudoxenodontinae.

Species
The following six species are recognized as being valid.
 Pseudoxenodon bambusicola T. Vogt, 1922 – bamboo snake
 Pseudoxenodon baramensis (M.A. Smith, 1921) – Baramen bamboo snake
 Pseudoxenodon inornatus (F. Boie, 1827) – dull bamboo snake
 Pseudoxenodon karlschmidti Pope, 1928 – Chinese bamboo snake
 Pseudoxenodon macrops (Blyth, 1855) – large-eyed bamboo snake, big-eyed bamboo snake
 Pseudoxenodon stejnegeri Barbour, 1908 – Stejneger's bamboo snake

Nota bene: A binomial authority in parentheses indicates that the species was originally described in a genus other than Pseudoxenodon.

Etymology
The specific names, karlschmidti and stejnegeri, are in honor of American herpetologists Karl Patterson Schmidt and Leonhard Stejneger, respectively.

References

Further reading
Boulenger GA (1890). The Fauna of British India, Including Ceylon and Burma. Reptilia and Batrachia. London: Secretary of State for India in Council. (Taylor and Francis, printers). xviii + 541 pp. (Pseudoxenodon, new genus, p. 340).
Boulenger GA (1893). Catalogue of the Snakes in the British Museum (Natural History). Volume I., Containing the Families ... Colubridæ Aglyphæ, part. London: Trustees of the British Museum (Natural History). (Taylor and Francis, printers). xiii + 448 pp. + Plates I-XXVIII. (Genus Pseudoxenodon, p. 270).
Smith MA (1943). The Fauna of British India, Ceylon and Burma, Including the Whole of the Indo-Chinese Sub-region. Reptilia and Amphibia. Vol. III.—Serpentes. London: Secretary of State for India. (Taylor and Francis, printers). xii + 583 pp. (Genus Pseudoxenodon, p. 311).

Pseudoxenodon
Snake genera
Taxa named by George Albert Boulenger